Current Major League Baseball team owners and the principal corporate entities that operate the clubs:

List

Notes
The Atlanta Braves sale in 2007 to Liberty Media was part of a complex swap of cash, stock, magazine holdings, and the Braves, in which Time Warner sent the Braves, a hobbyist publishing company, and $980,000,000 to Liberty in exchange for approximately 68.5 million shares of Time Warner stock, at the time worth $1.48 billion. It was announced and confirmed that the Braves were given a value of $450,000,000 in the transaction.
The price for the St. Louis Cardinals included Busch Stadium.
As much as $200,000,000 of the sale price included the team's 20-percent stake in Fox Sports San Diego.

See also
List of professional sports team owners
List of current Major League Baseball general managers

 List of NHL franchise owners
 List of NFL franchise owners
 List of NBA team owners
 List of MLS team owners

References

External links
2008 Forbes MLB Team Valuations

Major League Baseball principal owners